Proprioseiopsis fragariae is a species of mite in the family Phytoseiidae.

References

fragariae
Articles created by Qbugbot
Animals described in 1958